Fuyang Prison is a prison in Fuyang, Anhui, China. It was established in 1971. It is a mid-size enterprise that works across a variety of industries, including fabric manufacturing, machine processing, and clothing manufacturing.

See also
List of prisons in Anhui

References

External links 
Laogai Research Foundation Handbook 

Fuyang
Prisons in Anhui
1971 establishments in China